The Left Leg is a novel that was published in 1940 by Phoebe Atwood Taylor writing as Alice Tilton.  It is the fourth of the eight Leonidas Witherall mysteries.

Plot summary

It's a winter day in Dalton (a New England town near Boston) and Leonidas Witherall, "the man who looks like Shakespeare", is stepping off a bus after having been accused of bothering a beautiful young woman in a scarlet wimple (who promptly becomes known as the Scarlet Wimpernel).  He takes refuge in a hardware store run by a former student, Lincoln Potter.  Potter is inclined to be helpful, until the Wimpernel's purse is discovered in Witherall's pocket and Witherall is incautious enough to admit that he saw Potter's cash register being emptied by a man in a green satin suit carrying a small harp.  He heads for the home of a former teaching colleague, Marcus Meredith, and finds him murdered—and missing his artificial left leg.  Potter is enlisted by Witherall for help in solving the murder, along with intrepid housewife Topsey Beaton.  Together they deceive an entire rummage sale, enlist the Scarlet Wimpernel to play a role, find the man in green satin, locate the left leg, and solve the murder.

Literary significance and criticism
(See Phoebe Atwood Taylor.)  This is the fourth Leonidas Witherall mystery novel and it parallels the tone which was maintained in the other seven.  A murder occurs under embarrassing circumstances, and Leonidas forms a motley crew of assistants together in order to track down clues, chase around the town, and solve the mystery.  There is a strong vein of humor and the plot is fast-moving.

The adventures of Leonidas Witherall were a short-lived radio series at about the time of this novel.  In the novels, Witherall is also the author of a radio series and novels about the adventures of stalwart Lieutenant Hazeltine.  Some supporting characters continue between novels; there is always a beautiful girl, a handsome former student, and an intrepid housewife.

1940 American novels
Novels by Phoebe Atwood Taylor
Novels set in Massachusetts
W. W. Norton & Company books